Krivodol ("crooked ravine") is a town in northwestern Bulgaria, part of Vratsa Province. It is the administrative centre of Krivodol municipality, which lies in the western part of Vratsa Province, halfway between Vratsa and Montana and 130 kilometres north of Sofia.

In 1880, Krivodol had a population of 982, in the early 20th century 1,117. Following World War II, it had grown to 2,812. The town has a historical museum with an ethnographic collection and an art gallery. Notable natives are Georgi Milchev ("Godzhi"), a bassist with Slavi's Show and singer Nina Nikolina.

Municipality
Krivodol municipality has an area of 326 square kilometres and includes the following 15 places:

The village of Gradeshnitsa is famous for the Gradeshnitsa tablets unearthed in 1969, a testimony of proto-writing known as the Vinča signs.

Honour
Krivodol Glacier on Smith Island, South Shetland Islands is named after Krivodol.

External links
 Krivodol municipality website 

Towns in Bulgaria
Populated places in Vratsa Province